"Mr. Bojangles" is a song written and originally recorded by American country music artist Jerry Jeff Walker for his 1968 album of the same title.

Composition 
Walker said he was inspired to write the song after an encounter with a street performer in a New Orleans jail. While in jail for public intoxication in 1965, he met a homeless man who called himself "Mr. Bojangles" to conceal his true identity from the police. Mr. Bojangles had been arrested as part of a police sweep of indigent people that was carried out following a high-profile murder. The two men and others in the cell chatted about all manner of things, but when Mr. Bojangles told a story about his dog, the mood in the room turned heavy. Someone else in the cell asked for something to lighten the mood, and Mr. Bojangles obliged with a tap dance. The homeless "Mr. Bojangles", who was white, had taken his pseudonym from Bill "Bojangles" Robinson (1878–1949), a Black entertainer.

Notable recordings 
The song was first recorded by popular Austin performer Allen Wayne Damron during a live performance at the Chequered Flag folk club in Austin in 1967. Jerry Jeff Walker recorded his single version (with Bobby Woods, Charlie Freeman, Sandy Rhodes, Tommy McClure, Sammy Creason, and a string orchestra) in Memphis, Tennessee on June 7, 1968, and it was released by Atco Records on June 20. He also recorded a non-string version in New York City for his album Mr. Bojangles with David Bromberg, Gary Illingworth, Danny Milhon, Bobby Cranshaw, Jody Stecher, Donny Brooks, Ron Carter, Bill LaVorgna, and Jerry Jemmott. It was released by Atco on September 25, 1968. Other versions including those by Frankie Laine and Harry Belafonte were also recorded.

Nitty Gritty Dirt Band 
Since then, it has been recorded by many other artists, including US country rock band Nitty Gritty Dirt Band, whose version (recorded for the 1970 album Uncle Charlie & His Dog Teddy) was issued as a single and rose to No. 9 on the Billboard Hot 100 in 1971.

The band's single version begins with the Uncle Charlie interview (subtitled "Prologue: Uncle Charlie and his Dog Teddy") that also precedes the song on the Uncle Charlie album. It was originally backed with another interview with Uncle Charlie, also taken from the album. When "Mr. Bojangles" started climbing the charts, the B-side was re-pressed with the same song without the interview. NGDB guitarist Jeff Hanna performed most of the lead vocals on the track, with bandmate Jimmy Ibbotson performing harmony vocals; the two switched these roles on the last verse.

Sammy Davis Jr. 
The song became one of Sammy Davis Jr.'s "long-loved" signature performances, which he recorded for his 1972 album Portrait of Sammy Davis Jr. and sang at President Richard Nixon's invitation at a concert at the White House the following year.

Chart history

Weekly charts

Jerry Jeff Walker

The Nitty Gritty Dirt Band

Year-end charts

Al Cherny

Nina Simone

References

External links
 Lyrics at oldielyrics.com
 

1968 songs
1970 singles
1971 singles
2002 singles
Bob Dylan songs
Jerry Jeff Walker songs
Nina Simone songs
Neil Diamond songs
Jud Strunk songs
Sammy Davis Jr. songs
Nancy Wilson (jazz singer) songs
Nitty Gritty Dirt Band songs
Lulu (singer) songs
Tom T. Hall songs
Liberty Records singles
Robbie Williams songs
Cultural depictions of dancers